Pierre Lacroix (August 3, 1948 – December 13, 2020) was a Canadian ice hockey executive. He was the president and general manager of the Quebec Nordiques/Colorado Avalanche from 1994 to 2006. After the Nordiques moved to Colorado in 1995, he built teams that won the Stanley Cup twice, in 1996 and 2001.

Executive and Management career
Lacroix became president and general manager of the Quebec Nordiques in 1994, and followed the team to Denver a year later. He was known for his astute trades, such as his acquisition of Patrick Roy during the 1995–96 NHL season that led to a Cup that season and his trades for star defensemen Ray Bourque during the 1999–2000 NHL season and Rob Blake during the 2000–01 NHL season that also led to a Stanley Cup in 2001.

On March 8, 2006, a day before the NHL trade deadline, Pierre Lacroix traded goalie David Aebischer for 2002 Hart and Vezina trophy winner José Théodore. This trade was criticized in the local media at the time because Théodore was having a very bad season and was injured at the time of the trade. This criticism from media and fans continued at varying degrees throughout Théodore's short tenure with the Avalanche.

On May 12, 2006, Lacroix announced that he would be giving up his general manager duties and focusing solely on a new role as team president. On May 10, 2013, Lacroix announced that he was stepping down as president and would serve in an advisory role for the club.

On April 8, 2008, Lacroix was inducted into the Colorado Sports Hall of Fame for his contributions to the Colorado Avalanche organization.

Personal life and death
Lacroix was the father of two sons, including former NHL player Eric Lacroix. 

He died from complications of COVID-19 in Las Vegas on December 13, 2020, during the COVID-19 pandemic in Nevada.

See also
Notable families in the NHL

References

1948 births
2020 deaths
Colorado Avalanche executives
Deaths from the COVID-19 pandemic in Nevada
Ice hockey people from Montreal
French Quebecers
Laval National coaches
National Hockey League executives
Quebec Nordiques executives
Stanley Cup champions